Coloma, also known as Rocky Run, is an unincorporated community in Reserve Township, Parke County, in the U.S. state of Indiana.

History
Coloma was laid out in 1876. The community supposedly was named after Coloma, California. A post office was established at Coloma in 1868, and remained in operation until it was discontinued in 1905.

Geography

References

Unincorporated communities in Indiana
Unincorporated communities in Parke County, Indiana